Jonathan Dorr Bradley (April 1803 – September 8, 1862) was an American lawyer and politician.

He was the son of the Hon. William Czar Bradley, and was born in Westminster, Vermont, April, 1803. He graduated from Yale College in 1822. He entered upon the profession of the Law, and was settled
first at Bellows Falls, Vermont, and afterwards at Brattleboro, Vermont. To his legal attainments, he added unusual acquisitions in literature and science.

In 1856 and 1857 he represented the town of Brattleboro in the Vermont Legislature, and he was also a member of the Board of Education in Vermont, from its organization until  his death.

He died in Brattleboro, Vermont, September 8, 1862, aged 59 years, 5 months. He left a widow and four sons.

Further reading 

 Schlesinger Library, Harvard University: Papers of the Bradley family, 1813-1957

1803 births
1862 deaths
Yale College alumni
Vermont lawyers
School board members in Vermont
Members of the Vermont House of Representatives
19th-century American politicians
19th-century American lawyers